Massimiliano Tacchinardi (born 2 August 1971) is an Italian former professional footballer who played as a defender.

He is the elder brother of fellow former footballer Alessio Tacchinardi.

External links
Inter Archive

1971 births
Living people
Italian footballers
Association football central defenders
Inter Milan players
A.C.R. Messina players
S.S.D. Pro Sesto players
F.C. Ponsacco 1920 S.S.D. players
Serie A players
Serie B players
UEFA Cup winning players